The Military World Games is a multi-sport event for military sportspeople, organized by the International Military Sports Council (CISM). They have been held since 1995, although championships for separate sports had been held for some years. A winter edition of the games was subsequently created; the first edition was organized by the Italian region of Aosta Valley from 20 to 25 of March 2010.

Sports

Summer Games 

Military sports

Winter Games

Editions

Summer Games

Winter Games

Cadet Games 

Source:

Medals

Summer Games 
As of 2019 Military World Games.

Winter Games 
As of 2017 Winter Military World Games.

See also 

 International Army Games
 World Military Championships
 World Military Cup
 Africa Military Games
 Invictus Games
 Military pentathlon
 World Police and Fire Games

References

External links 
International military sports council
Athletics medalists
Winter Military World Games 2010 - Aosta Valley (Italy)

 
Military sports competitions
Multi-sport events
Recurring sporting events established in 1995
Quadrennial sporting events